A rifle is a firearm with a stock and a barrel that has a spiral groove or grooves ("rifling") cut into its interior. 

Rifle or The Rifle(s) may also refer to:

Military
The Rifles, a regiment of the British Army
Rifle regiment, British light infantry armed with rifles
Rifle regiment, a type of Russian and Soviet unit of the rifle troops type

Entertainment
The Rifle, a 1995 novel by American writer Gary Paulsen
The Rifles (band), an English rock band
"Rifles", a song by Black Rebel Motorcycle Club on the album B.R.M.C.
"The Rifle", a second-season episode of Peter Gunn, 1959
"The Rifle", an episode of The Rough Riders, 1959 
"The Rifle (Dynasty)", a season 8 episode of Dynasty, 1988

Other uses
Rifle, Colorado, a city in Garfield County, Colorado, USA
Rifle (fashion), an Italian clothing company
Walter Pandiani (born 1976), Uruguayan footballer
RIFLE criteria, a classification system for acute renal failure
The Rifle, a shooting sports magazine and predecessor of American Rifleman

See also
 Riffle (disambiguation) 
 Rifling, the process of grooving a gun barrel to increase a projectile's range and accuracy
Rifleman (disambiguation), a private soldier in a rifle unit of infantry